Hassan Hassan Mezher (born 31 October 1981) is a Lebanese former footballer who played as a centre-back.

References

External links 
 
 
 
 

1981 births
Lebanese footballers
Living people
Association football central defenders
Lebanese Premier League players
Al Ahed FC players
Al Mabarra Club players
Lebanon international footballers
Lebanese Second Division players